Armando Manzo Ponce (born 16 October 1958) is a Mexican former professional footballer, who last played for Monterrey of the Primera División de México.

References

External links

1958 births
Living people
Mexico international footballers
Footballers from Mexico City
1986 FIFA World Cup players
Club América footballers
Club Necaxa footballers
C.F. Monterrey players
Liga MX players
Mexican footballers
Association football defenders